William Trevor Rhodes (10 November 1909 – 23 May 1993) was an English footballer who played 147 games for Port Vale between 1933 and 1938, having previously represented Yorkshire Amateur and Bradford Park Avenue. Able to play as a right-half or at inside-right, he was noted for his pace and shot power.

Career
Rhodes played for Yorkshire Amateur and Bradford Park Avenue, before joining Port Vale in June 1933. He scored his first goal for the "Valiants" on 11 September, in a 3–0 win over Bury at Gigg Lane. He went on to score a hat-trick on 6 January, in a 4–1 win over Southampton at The Dell. He finished the 1933–34 campaign with 11 goals in 31 appearances. He went on to score six goals in 36 games in 1934–35. He hit seven goals in 30 appearances in the 1935–36 season, including the winner against First Division champions Sunderland in an FA Cup Third Round replay at The Old Recreation Ground. Despite such cup exploits, Vale suffered relegation out of the Second Division. Rhodes bagged five goals in 36 games in 1936–37, as Vale struggled to adapt to life in the Third Division North. Rhodes lost his first team place through injury in November 1937, and went on to play just 14 games in the 1937–38 campaign. With 29 goals in 147 league and cup games, he was released from his contract in the summer.

Career statistics
Source:

References

1909 births
1993 deaths
Footballers from Leeds
English footballers
Association football midfielders
Association football forwards
Yorkshire Amateur A.F.C. players
Bradford (Park Avenue) A.F.C. players
Port Vale F.C. players
English Football League players